Brigandage in Southern Italy had existed in some form since ancient times. However its origins as outlaws targeting random travellers would evolve vastly later on in the form of the political resistance movement. During the time of the Napoleonic conquest of the Kingdom of Naples, the first signs of political resistance brigandage came to public light, as the Bourbon loyalists of the country refused to accept the new Bonapartist rulers and actively fought against them until the Bourbon monarchy had been reinstated. Some claim that the word brigandage is a euphemism for what was in fact a civil war.

History

In the upheaval of Sicily's transition out of feudalism in 1812, and the resulting lack of an effective government police force, banditry became a serious problem in much of rural Sicily during the 19th century. Rising food prices, the loss of public and church lands, and the loss of feudal common rights pushed many desperate peasants to banditry.

With no police to call upon, local elites in countryside towns recruited young men into "companies-at-arms" to hunt down thieves and negotiate the return of stolen property, in exchange for a pardon for the thieves and a fee from the victims, a development that is often seen as the genesis of the Mafia. These companies-at-arms were often made up of former bandits and criminals, usually the most skilled and violent of them. While this saved communities the trouble of maintaining their own policemen, this may have made the companies-at-arms more inclined to collude with their former brethren rather than destroy them.

After the conquest of the Kingdom of Two Sicilies in 1861 by the Savoyard Kingdom of Sardinia (later Kingdom of Italy), the most famous and well known form of brigandage in the area emerged. According to Marxist theoretician Nicola Zitara, social unrest, especially among the lower classes, occurred due to poor conditions, and the fact that the Risorgimento benefited in the "Mezzogiorno" only the bourgeoisie vast-land owning classes.  Many turned to brigandage in the mountains of Basilicata, Campania, Calabria and Abruzzo, but the brigands were not a homogeneous group, nor did they operate with any common cause. Amongst the brigands were a mixture of people, with different working backgrounds and motives; the brigands included former prisoners, bandits and other people who the Italian government regarded as common criminals, but also former soldiers and loyalists of the Bourbon army, as well as foreign mercenaries in the pay of the Bourbon king in exile, some nobles, poverty stricken farmers and peasants who wanted land reforms: both men and women took up arms.

They launched attacks not only against the Italian authorities and the land owning upper-classes, but also against common people, frequently looting villages, towns and farms, and committing armed robberies against both individuals and groups, including farmers, townspeople and rival brigand bands. Robberies by brigand bands were often accompanied by other acts of violence and vandalism, such as arsons, murders, rapes, kidnappings, extortions and crop burnings.

In 1863, an extremely strong handed repression of the brigands by the Italian authorities picked up, especially with the passing of the Pica Laws, which permitted the arrest of relatives and those suspected of collaborating or helping a brigand. The villages of Pontelandolfo and Casalduni in the Province of Benevento became the site of a massacre of thirteen brigands by Italian Bersaglieri,<ref>{{cite news |last=Desiderio|first=Giancristano|date=August 8, 2016|title=Pontelandolfo, una lettera inedita del 1861: "Perirono 13 persone"|publisher=sanniopress.it|url=http://www.sanniopress.it/2016/08/08/pontelandolfo-una-lettera-inedita-del-1861-perirono-13-persone}}</ref> conducted as a reprisal following the massacre of forty-five soldiers of the Italian army by local brigands. In total several thousand brigands were arrested and executed, while many more were deported or fled the country (see Italian diaspora). In Palermo in 1866, 40,000 Italian soldiers were needed to put down The Seven and a Half Days Revolt.

After the Italian Unification in 1861, unlike Southern Italy, brigandage was virtually non-existent in the other annexed states of northern and central Italy such as: Kingdom of Lombardy–Venetia, Duchy of Parma, Duchy of Modena, Grand Duchy of Tuscany, Papal States, because the situation of Southern Italy was very different, owing to the previous centuries of history and the Italian southern historian and politician Francesco Saverio Nitti,  describes how brigandage was endemic in Southern Italy already before 1860, using the following words from his book Eroi e briganti (Heroes and brigands), translated into English: « … every part of Europe has had brigands and criminals, that in war and misfortune time dominated the countryside, and put themselves out of the law […] but there was only one country in Europe where brigandage has existed we can say always […] a country where brigandage for many centuries can look like a huge river of blood and hates […] a country where for centuries monarchy based itself on brigandage, that became like a historical agent: this is the country of Midday » (from Italian “Mezzodì” or “Mezzogiorno” to mean the South of Italy, here referred to the 19th century) . 

In relation to the thesis which regards brigandage in southern Italy as a popular revolt against Italian unification or the House of Savoy, it is to be observed that after 1865–1870, the brigandage movement was never followed up by any anti-Savoy or anti-unification movement. Many southern Italians held high positions in the new Italian government, such as the 11th Prime Minister of Italy Francesco Crispi. Italians from southern Italy would also go on to play a key role in the ultra-nationalist Fascist movement, most notably the so-called 'philosopher of Fascism' Giovanni Gentile. The thesis which regards the South as hostile to Savoy after the unification also does not explain the fact that with the birth of the Italian Republic, after the referendum of June 2, 1946, the south voted overwhelmingly in favor of the Savoy monarchy, while the north voted for a republic, and from 1946 to 1972 the monarchist parties (which merged into the Italian Democratic Party of Monarchist Unity) gained acclaim especially in the South and in Naples (a city in which nearly 80% supported the Savoy monarchy).

Brigandage in Southern Italy would continue sporadically following the 1870s. Brigands such as Giuseppe Musolino and Francesco Paolo Varsallona at the turn of the 20th century and Salvatore Giuliano and Gaspare Pisciotta in the 1940s to 1950 all formed bands of brigands and gained significant status locally as folk heroes.

See also
Carmine Crocco
Ninco Nanco
Nicola Napolitano

References

 A. Maffei,  Brigand Life in Italy: A History of Bourbonist Reaction ca. 1865.
 Lupo, Salvatore (2009). The History of the Mafia, New York: Columbia University Press, 
 New York Times, Brigandage in the Two Sicilies''. April 25, 1874.

Kingdom of the Two Sicilies
Italian unification
Italian brigandage
Sicilian bandits
Sicilian rebels